Mary Frances Moriarty (born January 14, 1964) is an American attorney and politician serving as the County Attorney of Hennepin County, Minnesota. She is a member of the Minnesota Democratic–Farmer–Labor Party (DFL). Moriarty previously served as the Chief Public Defender of Hennepin County.

Early life and education 
Moriarty was born in Benson, Minnesota. Her mother, Linda, was an English teacher, and her father, Patrick, served as the Itasca County Attorney from 1963 to 1969, and was later a public defender in New Ulm. Moriarty worked briefly as a reporter before enrolling at Macalester College, where she played softball and basketball and majored in history and political science, earning her Bachelor of Arts in 1986. In 1989, she earned a Juris Doctor from the University of Minnesota Law School. After clerking for Hennepin County Judge Kevin Burke and passing the bar exam, Moriarty went to work for the Hennepin County Public Defender's Office.

Career 
Early in her career as a public defender, Moriarty argued a case that would eventually go to the U.S. Supreme Court. A Minneapolis police officer had patted down a man and claimed that he could feel through the man's jacket that a small lump was crack cocaine, justifying the search. Moriarty argued that it would have been impossible to identify the lump as drugs. On June 7, 1993, the high court unanimously agreed, ruling that the officer had exceeded the limits of a legal pat-down. The case (Minnesota v. Dickerson) established what is referred to across the United States as the plain feel doctrine.

Chief public defender of Hennepin County 
In 2014, after spending 25 years as a public defender, Moriarty was selected as Hennepin County's first female chief public defender. As chief, Moriarty oversaw some 45,000 cases per year and managed a staff of 140 attorneys and over 70 support staff including investigators, dispositional advisors, paralegals, IT personnel, legal office assistants and law clerks. An evaluation from the National Center for State Courts stated that under Moriarty's leadership, Hennepin County had one of the best public defender offices in the country, one that was as successful as a private law firm.

Moriarty and her team exposed inequities in the criminal legal system within Hennepin County. In 2018, they showed that low-level marijuana stings in Hennepin County overwhelmingly targeted Black people. Moriarty's office forced Hennepin County Attorney Mike Freeman and the Minneapolis Police Department to stop the stings, which many viewed as racially biased. In 2020, Moriarty's office conducted a study that revealed Black people were overwhelmingly more likely to be stopped by police for traffic violations—even though White drivers were more likely to have contraband.

On December 23, 2019, Minnesota State Public Defender Bill Ward announced that he was placing Moriarty on indefinite suspension. The Minnesota Board of Public Defense hired a law firm to investigate allegations that she had posted offensive content on social media, created a fearful environment in her office and fractured relationships with criminal justice leaders. Ward pushed the state board not to renew the contract of Moriarty. Minnesota Attorney General Keith Ellison said that Moriarty is “one of the most principled people I know. I'm concerned about her treatment; it appears connected to her advocacy for racial justice.” Ellison called for the Minnesota Board of Public Defense to examine the process that led to Moriarty's suspension, saying he believed Moriarty was targeted for speaking out against racial bias in the criminal justice system.

On September 30, 2020, in a highly controversial move, the Minnesota Board of Public Defense voted 4–2 against re-appointing Moriarty. During the six-hour board meeting, Moriarty rebutted accusations made against her, saying she was being attacked because of her advocacy for her clients and against racial injustices. Moriarty accused the board of sexism and holding a double standard regarding her advocacy for clients and staff. Moriarty clashed with Ward, who she said bullied and harassed her, belittling her by calling her "young lady."

On June 22, 2021, the Minnesota Board of Public Defense agreed to pay Moriarty a $300,000 settlement. The state board did not admit wrongdoing, but it "agreed to a complete settlement of all of the disputes" between state leadership and Moriarty, avoiding a future lawsuit, according to the out-of-court settlement. In return, Moriarty officially retired from the Hennepin County Public Defender's Office.

Hennepin County Attorney (2022–present) 

On September 1, 2021, Hennepin County Attorney Mike Freeman announced that he would retire at the end of his term after 24 years in the role. Moriarty announced the same day that she would explore a campaign for the open Hennepin County Attorney position. On September 27, 2021, Moriarty officially declared her candidacy. She came out as queer during her campaign. Moriarty earned the endorsement of the Minnesota DFL at its convention in Hopkins on May 14, 2022, after two rounds of voting. A nonpartisan primary was held on August 9, 2022, with Moriarty and former judge Martha Holton Dimick advancing to the general election. on November 8, 2022, Moriarty was elected Hennepin county attorney, defeating Dimick. She is the first LGBT person to serve as the Heppenpin County Attorney.

On November 14, 2022, Moriarty announced that State Representative Cedrick Frazier and law professor Mark Osler would serve as co-chairs of her transition committee.

Electoral history

See also 

 List of first openly LGBT politicians in the United States

References

1964 births
Minnesota lawyers
Living people
Macalester College alumni
Minnesota Democrats
People from New Ulm, Minnesota
Public defenders
University of Minnesota Law School alumni
21st-century American women lawyers
21st-century American LGBT people
Queer women
LGBT lawyers
LGBT people from Minnesota
American LGBT politicians